Evangeline Lodge Land Lindbergh (May 29, 1876 – September 7, 1954) is best known as the mother of famed aviator Charles Lindbergh.  Raised in a highly educated family, her father dentist Charles H. Land pioneered porcelain and gold teeth crowns and her uncle John Christian Lodge (1862-1950) was the 51st, 54th, and 56th mayor of Detroit. Swamped by international news reporters after her son's success flying the first solo crossing of the Atlantic Ocean, Evangeline said; "I am grateful. There is no use attempting to find words to express my happiness."

Personal life 
Born Evangeline Lodge Land in Detroit on 29 May 1876 to newlyweds, married in 1875, Dr. Charles Henry Land (1847-1922) and Evangeline Lodge (1850-1919).

In 1899, Evangeline graduated from the University of Michigan and taught chemistry at Little Falls High School.  On 27 March 1901, she married Charles August Lindbergh.  Evangeline gave birth to son Charles Augustus Lindbergh on 4 Feb 1902.  Later that year, they settled into a new house of the river in Little Falls, Minnesota. 
Charles had established a successful law practice in Little Falls after University of Michigan Law School graduation in 1883.  His first wife Mary LaFond died after abdominal surgery in 1898.  Charles, a Republican, served as a U.S. Congressman (R-Minn.-6) from 1907 to 1917.

Evangeline often had difficulty raising her two step-daughters, Lillian and Eva, who both eventually moved away.  She often threatened Lindbergh with divorce, who caved in to her demands, fearing a divorce would cost him his seat in congress. After further problems, Evangeline began to live in a separate residence in 1909.  Her son graduated Little Falls High School on June 5, 1918. The couple separated in 1918, their only child being the famous aviator Charles Lindbergh.  In 1920, Evangeline and her son rented rooms at a boarding house in Madison while Charles Jr. attended the University of Wisconsin–Madison. Lindbergh dropped out in the middle of his sophomore year to fly in Lincoln, Nebraska.  Evangeline spent one summer traveling with her son as he barnstormed through the mid west United States.   Resuming her career, Evangeline graduated from Columbia University in 1925 with a master's degree in education.  Except for teaching in Istanbul, Turkey from 1928 to 1929, she taught chemistry at the Cass Technical High School in Detroit from 1922 until retirement in 1942.

In 1938 she accompanied her daughter in law and son who, at the request of the United States military, traveled to Germany to evaluate German aviation.  At a dinner hosted by ambassador to Germany Hugh Wilson, Charles Lindbergh was presented the Order of the German Eagle by Germany's air chief, Hermann Göring, in attendance was Anne Lindbergh, Evangeline Lindbergh, and German aviation figures: Ernst Heinkel, Adolf Baeumker, and Willy Messerschmitt.

Evangeline Lodge Land Lindbergh died of Parkinson's disease on 7 September 1954 in Grosse Pointe Park, Michigan.  Her grave site is located in the Pine Lake Cemetery, West Bloomfield, Michigan.

The Lindbergh's first family property is now the Charles Lindbergh House and Museum on the Charles A. Lindbergh State Park in Little Falls, Minnesota.

Gallery

See also

Charles A. Lindbergh the aviator
C.A. Lindbergh the congressman
List of people diagnosed with Parkinson's disease

References

Bibliography 
 Larson, Bruce L. Lindbergh of Minnesota: A Political Biography. New York: Harcourt Brace Jovanovich, Inc., 1973. .
 Lindbergh, Charles A. An Autobiography of Values. New York, 1976.
 Duffy, James P. Lindbergh v. Roosevelt. United States: MJF Books, 2010

External links 
 
 Charles Lindbergh House and Museum
 The Charles A. Lindbergh and Family Papers are available for research use at the Minnesota Historical Society.

1876 births
1954 deaths
Evangeline Lodge Land Lindbergh
People from Detroit
University of Michigan alumni
Columbia University alumni
Parkinson's disease
Charles Lindbergh